Iridana agneshorvathae is a butterfly in the family Lycaenidae. It is found in Ghana. The habitat consists of dry semi-deciduous forests.

The length of the forewings is about 16 mm.

References

Endemic fauna of Ghana
Butterflies described in 2008
Poritiinae